Impressionism is an art movement.

Impressionism or Impressionist may also refer to:

 Impressionism (literature)
 Impressionism in music
 Impressionist (entertainment), a performer who imitates famous people
 The Impressionists (TV series), a 2006 BBC drama series
 The Impressionists: Painting and Revolution, a 2011 BBC documentary series presented by Waldemar Januszczak
 Impressionists (video game), 1997
 Impressionism (play), a 2009 play by Michael Jacobs

See also